The 1961 All-Ireland Senior Football Championship Final was the 74th All-Ireland Final and the deciding match of the 1961 All-Ireland Senior Football Championship, an inter-county Gaelic football tournament for the top teams in Ireland. A crowd of 90,556 (a record at the old Croke Park) watched the match between Down and Offaly.

Match
The biggest crowd ever to attend Croke Park saw an explosive opening to the match - Offaly's Mick Casey and Peter Daly got goals to put them six points ahead with the match barely begun. Down recovered with three goals by half-time, and led by two points with minutes to go. Har Donnelly had a 21-yard free for Offaly, and took a point when a goal was really needed.

Legacy
This was Down's second appearance in an All-Ireland final, and their second win from two. It was the second of three All-Ireland football titles won by Down in the 1960s, which made them joint "team of the decade" with Galway who also won three.

References

All-Ireland Senior Football Championship Final
All-Ireland Senior Football Championship Final
All-Ireland Senior Football Championship Final, 1961
All-Ireland Senior Football Championship Finals
All-Ireland Senior Football Championship Finals
Down county football team matches
Offaly county football team matches